The Greek Menaea was a 12-volume set of books published in Venice in 1880 including various hagiographies.

Contents
It includes biographies of the following Christian saints:

Abercius
Abercius the Martyr
Pelagia the Harlot
Romanus of Samosata

References

Christian hagiography
Italian books
1880 books